Jørgen Gunnarsson Løvland (3 February 1848 – 21 August 1922) was a Norwegian educator and civil servant of the Liberal Party who served as the 10th prime minister of Norway from 1907 to 1908.

Background
Løvland was born at Lauvland in  Evje (Lauvland i Evje herad) in Aust-Agder, Norway. He came from a farming family. He graduated from Christianssands Stifts Seminarium teachers’ seminary  in 1865. He worked  as primary school teacher in Christianssand (1866-1878) and then as headmaster in Setesdal (1878-1884). From 1884 to 1892 he was also editor of Christianssands Stiftsavis.

Political career
He represented the Liberal party at the Norwegian Parliament (Storting) 1886-1888 and again in 1892–1898.  He was Minister of Labour (1898–1899, 1900–1902, 1902–1903), a member of the Council of State Division in Stockholm (1899–1900), Minister of Foreign Affairs (1905 and 1905–1907), Prime Minister and Minister of Foreign Affairs (1907–1908), and Minister of Education and Church Affairs (1915–1920). In 1905 became the  prime minister in Stockholm. He was chair of the Norwegian government of Christian Michelsen. In October 1907, Løvland took over as Norwegian Prime Minister when Michelsen resigned. Løvland resigned the position in March 1908.

Norwegian Nobel Committee
Løvland was a member of the Norwegian Nobel Committee from the foundation in 1897 until his death in 1922. He was the committee's chairman  (1901–1921).

Personal life
He was married to Mathilde Løvland (1851–1938). Following their deaths, both he and his wife were buried at Vår Frelsers gravlund in Oslo.

See also

Løvland's Cabinet

References

External links
 The Norwegian Nobel Institute Series 

1848 births
1922 deaths
People from Evje og Hornnes
Norwegian educators
Presidents of the Storting
Government ministers of Norway
Noregs Mållag
Chairpersons of the Norwegian Nobel Committee
Burials at the Cemetery of Our Saviour
Ministers of Education of Norway